Steere may refer to:

 Steere (surname)
 Mount Steere, a shield volcano in Antarctica
 Steere River, in Western Australia
 Steere Bodacious, an American single seat aircraft